Johan Baptist Spanoghe (1798, Madras – 22 April 1838, Pekalongan, Java) was a Dutch botanical collector of Belgian parentage.

A native of Madras, then part of British India, he became a civil servant with the Dutch East Indies government in 1816. In 1821, he was named as an "assistant resident" for the southern divisions of the Bantam Residency in western Java. From 1831 to 1836, he was stationed on the island of Timor.

As a botanist in the East Indies, he collected plants in Java, Timor and neighboring islands, and also in Bali. The genus Spanoghea was named in his honor by Carl Ludwig Blume, who for a period of time, worked closely with Spanoghe in Java.

Publications 
 Prodromus Florae Timorensis, . 1838. (Linnaea, XV. 161-208, 314-350, 476-480. 1841).

References 

1798 births
1838 deaths
19th-century Dutch botanists
Scientists from Chennai